The 2012–13 season of the Frauen-Bundesliga was the 23rd season of Germany's premier women's football league. The season began on 1 September 2012 and ended on 12 May 2013. Turbine Potsdam were the defending champions.

The title was won by VfL Wolfsburg for the first time. Turbine Potsdam finished in second place and qualified for the UEFA Women's Champions League.

Duisburg and Bad Neuenahr went into administration during the season. As a result, Bad Neuenahr decided to withdraw from the league, sparing Sindelfingen from relegation.

Changes from 2011–12
SG Essen-Schönebeck was renamed SGS Essen and played their home games in the Stadion Essen.

Teams
The teams promoted from the previous season's 2nd Bundesliga were VfL Sindelfingen as winners of the Southern division and FSV Gütersloh 2009 as runners-up of the Northern division.

Managerial changes

League table

Results

Top scorers
Ogimi won her first top-scorer award in the Bundesliga (women).

References

External links
News, Matchdetails, Teams, Transfers on weltfussball.de
Season on soccerway.com

2012-13
Ger
Women1
1